Cercyonis oetus, the small wood-nymph or dark wood-nymph, is a butterfly of the family Nymphalidae. It is found in western North America.

The wingspan is 32–45 mm. Adults are on wing from June to August in one generation.

The larvae feed on various grasses.

Subspecies
There are four recognized subspecies:
Cercyonis oetus oetus
Cercyonis oetus charon (Edwards, 1872)
Cercyonis oetus silvestris (Edwards, 1861)
Cercyonis oetus pallescens T. & J. Emmel, 1971

References

External links
 Small Wood Nymph, Butterflies and Moths of North America
 Small Wood-Nymph, Butterflies of Canada

Cercyonis
Butterflies of North America
Butterflies described in 1869
Taxa named by Jean Baptiste Boisduval